Alstroemeria ligtu is a species of flowering plant in the family Alstroemeriaceae, native to Peru, northwest Argentina and central Chile.

References

ligtu
Flora of Peru
Flora of Northwest Argentina
Flora of central Chile
Plants described in 1762
Taxa named by Carl Linnaeus